Byers Station Historic District is a national historic district located in Upper Uwchlan Township, Chester County, Pennsylvania. The district includes 26 contributing buildings in the crossroads community of Byers Station. The buildings date to the 19th century and include a number of notable Italianate style buildings.  Notable buildings include a variety of residences, a factory, a Masonic lodge (1894), and the former Byers Hotel (c. 1874). The community grew around the Byers railroad station, after its opening in 1871, and continued after plumbago (graphite) was discovered in the area in 1875.

It was added to the National Register of Historic Places in 2002.

References

Italianate architecture in Pennsylvania
Greek Revival architecture in Pennsylvania
Historic districts in Chester County, Pennsylvania
Historic districts on the National Register of Historic Places in Pennsylvania
National Register of Historic Places in Chester County, Pennsylvania